Ardabil Anthropology Museum is a museum in Ardabil, Iran. The building of the museum was originally a historical bath with the name of Zahir-al-Islam, belonging to the pre-Safavid period, about second half of the seventh century AH. Cultural Heritage Organization of Iran changed it to the Museum of Anthropology in 1999. The museum is near to the Sheikh Safi mausoleum.

References

External links

Interior photographs

Museums in Iran
Buildings and structures in Ardabil
Anthropology museums
Tourist attractions in Ardabil Province